Caquetio is an extinct Arawakan language of Venezuela. The Caquetio people lived along the shores of Lake Maracaibo and on the Dutch 'ABC' islands of Aruba, Curaçao and Bonaire.

References

Arawakan languages
Languages of Venezuela
Languages of the Netherlands
Languages extinct in the 1860s
Indigenous languages of the Caribbean
Languages of Aruba
Languages of Bonaire
Languages of Curaçao